Moustafa Ibrahim (born 1 August 1970) is an Egyptian former footballer. He competed in the men's tournament at the 1992 Summer Olympics.

References

External links
 
 

1970 births
Living people
Egyptian footballers
Olympic footballers of Egypt
Footballers at the 1992 Summer Olympics
Place of birth missing (living people)
Association football forwards
Zamalek SC players